Symphyotrichum vahlii (formerly Aster vahlii and Erigeron vahlii) is a species of flowering plant in the family Asteraceae native to South America, specifically Bolivia, Chile, Argentina, and the Falkland Islands. Its flowers have white ray florets of length . It grows in wetland areas of tall forests with trees that exceed . One infraspecies is accepted, Symphyotrichum vahlii var. tenuifolium, in addition to the autonym S. vahlii var. vahlii.

Gallery

Citations

References

vahlii
Flora of Argentina
Flora of Bolivia
Flora of Chile
Flora of the Falkland Islands
Plants described in 1825
Taxa named by Charles Gaudichaud-Beaupré